Thamirabharani may refer to:

 Thamirabarani River
 Thaamirabharani, a 2007 Indian Tamil film